In the mathematics of infinite graphs, an end of a graph represents, intuitively, a direction in which the graph extends to infinity. Ends may be formalized mathematically as equivalence classes of infinite paths, as havens describing strategies for pursuit–evasion games on the graph, or (in the case of locally finite graphs) as topological ends of topological spaces associated with the graph.

Ends of graphs may be used (via Cayley graphs) to define ends of finitely generated groups. Finitely generated infinite groups have one, two, or infinitely many ends, and the Stallings theorem about ends of groups provides a decomposition for groups with more than one end.

Definition and characterization
A  in an infinite graph is a semi-infinite simple path; that is, it is an infinite sequence of vertices  in which each vertex appears at most once in the sequence and each two consecutive vertices in the sequence are the two endpoints of an edge in the graph. This is an equivalence relation: each ray is equivalent to itself, the definition is symmetric with regard to the ordering of the two rays, and it can be shown to be transitive. Therefore, it partitions the set of all rays into equivalence classes, and Halin defined an end as one of these equivalence classes.

Ends also have a more concrete characterization in terms of havens, functions that describe evasion strategies for pursuit–evasion games on a graph . The police have helicopters and therefore do not need to follow the edges; however the robber can see the police coming and can choose where to move next before the helicopters land. A haven is a function  that maps each set  of police locations to one of the connected components of the subgraph formed by deleting ; a robber can evade the police by moving in each round of the game to a vertex within this component. Every ray in  corresponds to a haven of order , namely, the function ; that maps every finite set  to the unique component of  that contains infinitely many vertices of the ray. Conversely, every haven of order  can be defined in this way by a ray. Two rays are equivalent if and only if they define the same haven, so the ends of a graph are in one-to-one correspondence with its havens of order .

Examples

However, all of these rays are equivalent to each other, so  only has one end.

If  is a forest (that is, a graph with no finite cycles), then the intersection of any two rays is either a path or a ray; two rays are equivalent if their intersection is a ray. However, there exist uncountably infinite graphs with only one end in which every spanning tree has infinitely many ends.

If  is an infinite grid graph, then it has many rays, and arbitrarily large sets of vertex-disjoint rays. However, it has only one end. This may be seen most easily using the characterization of ends in terms of havens: the removal of any finite set of vertices leaves exactly one infinite connected component, so there is only one haven (the one that maps each finite set to the unique infinite connected component).

Relation to topological ends
If a topological space can be covered by a nested sequence of compact sets , then an end of the space is a sequence of components  of the complements of the compact sets. This definition does not depend on the choice of the compact sets: the ends defined by one such choice may be placed in one-to-one correspondence with the ends defined by any other choice.

An infinite graph  may be made into a topological space in two different but related ways:
In either case, every finite subgraph of  corresponds to a compact subspace of the topological space, and every compact subspace corresponds to a finite subgraph together with, in the Hausdorff case, finitely many compact proper subsets of edges. Thus, a graph may be covered by a nested sequence of compact sets if and only if it is locally finite, having a finite number of edges at every vertex.

If a graph  is connected and locally finite, then it has a compact cover in which the set  is the set of vertices at distance at most  from some arbitrarily chosen starting vertex. Thus, for connected and locally finite graphs, the topological ends are in one-to-one correspondence with the graph-theoretic ends.

For graphs that may not be locally finite, it is still possible to define a topological space from the graph and its ends. This space can be represented as a metric space if and only if the graph has a normal spanning tree, a rooted spanning tree such that each graph edge connects an ancestor-descendant pair. If a normal spanning tree exists, it has the same set of ends as the given graph: each end of the graph must contain exactly one infinite path in the tree.

Special kinds of ends

Free ends
An end  of a graph  is defined to be a free end if there is a finite set  of vertices with the property that  separates  from all other ends of the graph. In a graph with finitely many ends, every end must be free.  proves that, if  has infinitely many ends, then either there exists an end that is not free, or there exists an infinite family of rays that share a common starting vertex and are otherwise disjoint from each other.

Thick ends
A thick end of a graph  is an end that contains infinitely many pairwise-disjoint rays. Halin's grid theorem characterizes the graphs that contain thick ends: they are exactly the graphs that have a subdivision of the hexagonal tiling as a subgraph.

Special kinds of graphs

Symmetric and almost-symmetric graphs
As he shows, for every connected locally finite almost-symmetric graph, the number of ends is either at most two or uncountable; if it is uncountable, the ends have the topology of a Cantor set. Additionally, Mohar shows that the number of ends controls the Cheeger constant

where  ranges over all finite nonempty sets of vertices of the graph and
For almost-symmetric graphs with uncountably many ends, ; however, for almost-symmetric graphs with only two ends, .

Cayley graphs

Every group and a set of generators for the group determine a Cayley graph, a graph whose vertices are the group elements and the edges are pairs of elements  where  is one of the generators. In the case of a finitely generated group, the ends of the group are defined to be the ends of the Cayley graph for the finite set of generators; this definition is invariant under the choice of generators, in the sense that if two different finite set of generators are chosen, the ends of the two Cayley graphs are in one-to-one correspondence with each other.

For instance, every free group has a Cayley graph (for its free generators) that is a tree. The free group on one generator has a doubly infinite path as its Cayley graph, with two ends. Every other free group has infinitely many ends.

Every finitely generated infinite group has either 1, 2, or infinitely many ends, and the Stallings theorem about ends of groups provides a decomposition of groups with more than one end.  In particular:
 A finitely generated infinite group has 2 ends if and only if it has a cyclic subgroup of finite index.
 A finitely generated infinite group has infinitely many ends if and only if it is either a nontrivial free product with amalgamation or HNN-extension with finite amalgamation.
 All other finitely generated infinite groups have exactly one end.

Notes

References

Graph theory objects
Infinite graphs